Kim or Gim is the most common surname in Korea. As of the South Korean census of 2015, there were 10,689,959 people by this name in South Korea or 21.5% of the population. Even if the Korean surnames have the same pronunciation, there are different family clans(bon-gwan). Since there are dozens of these family clans, they all have different ancestors even if they are the same Kim in pronunciation. The family clans system that exists in Korea has a peculiarity different from the surnames of other countries.

Origin
The first historical document that records Kim in 636 references it as the surname of Korean king, Jinheung of Silla (526-576). In the Silla kingdom (57 BCE–935 CE) — which variously battled and allied with other states on the Korean peninsula and ultimately unified most of Korea in 668 — Kim (which means “gold”) was the name of a family that rose to prominence and became the rulers of Silla for 586 years. Silla and Gaya clans Kim came from the Huns (Xiongnu), according to the history books.

Clans
As with other Korean surnames, different lineages, known as bon-gwan or clans, are inherited from a father to his children. These designate the region of Korea, or paternal ancestor, from which they claim to originate.

The 2000 South Korean census listed 348 extant Kim lineages.

Major clans

Uiseong
The Uiseong Kim clan traces its lineage back to the last prince of Silla, who later became a monk.

Andong

There are two Andong Kim clans, distinguished as Gu and Shin, that have two separate progenitors.

Some of the notable Gu Andong Kim clan members were General Kim Si-min and Prime Minister Kim Sa-hyeong, who was involved with the Gangnido map, as well as Royal Noble Consort Hwi was banished for witchcraft.

The Shin Andong Kim clan was one of the powerful clans that dominated the later part of Joseon. One of the most powerful members from the clan was the Honorable Kim Josun, who was the father-in-law to Sunjo of Joseon. 
Kim Josun's daughter was Queen Sunwon.

Gimhae (Kimhae)

The origin of the clan traces back to Suro of Geumgwan Gaya who had ten children, thus starting the Kim dynasty of Geumgwan Gaya, the capital of which was in present-day Gimhae. Famous ancient members of this clan, aside from the kings of Geumgwan Gaya, include the Silla general Kim Yu-sin. In Later Silla, members of the Gimhae Kim family were admitted to all but the highest level of the Silla bone rank system.

This clan is by far the most populous of all Korean clans. According to the 2015 South Korean census, there were 4,456,700 Gimhae Kim clan members in South Korea.

Gyeongju

The Gyeongju Kims trace their descent from the ruling family of Silla. The founder of this clan is said to have been Gim Al-ji, an orphan adopted by King Talhae of Silla in the 1st century CE. Alji's seventh-generation descendant was the first member of the clan to take the throne, as King Michu of Silla in the year 262. According to the South Korean census of 2015, there were 1,800,853 Gyeongju Kim clans in South Korea.

Nagan
The Nagan Kim clan is extremely rare. Its progenitor, Kim Sujing, was a descendant of the last king of Silla and established their ancestral home in Suncheon. In the South Korean census of 2000, less than 10,000 citizens claimed to be Nagan Kims.

Hamchang
The Hamchang Kim trace their origin to the founder of the little-known Gaya confederacy state of Goryeong Gaya, King Taejo. His alleged tomb, rediscovered in the sixteenth century, is still preserved by the modern-day members of the clan. This clan numbered only 26,300 members in the 2000 South Korean census.

Gwangsan

The Gwangsan Kim clan was one of the most prominent clans during Joseon. The Gwangsan Kims are the descendants of Heung Gwang (흥광, 興光), who was the third prince of Sinmu of Silla, its 45th monarch.

Yaseong
The Yaseong Kim clan is from Yeongdeok County. The name Yeongdeok replaced an earlier name, Yaseong, which means "City in the Wilderness", and dates its origins back to Silla.

Cheongpung
The Cheongpung Kim clan was one of the aristocratic families during the Joseon. Two queens were from this clan during that period. Several members of the clan also became prime ministers.

Yeonan
The Yeonan Kim clan was an aristocratic family clan that had members in high government positions during the Joseon. Six members of the clan were prime ministers. The founder of the Yeonan Kim clan was Kim Seom-han, a descendant of Gim Al-ji.

Gangneung

The Gangneung Kim clan originated from Gangneung, Gangwon Province. The progenitor was Kim Juwon (김주원, 金周元) who was a descendant of Muyeol of Silla.

Sangsan
The Sangsan Kim clan originated from Sangju in North Gyeongsang Province, South Korea. The progenitor was Kim Su (김수, 金需) and the clan had members that participated in the government of Joseon.

Ulsan
The Ulsan Kim clan originated from Ulsan in South Korea. One of the members of this clan, Kim Inhu, was one of the 18 Sages of Korea and honored as a Munmyo Bae-hyang, (문묘배향, 文廟配享).

Seoheung
The Seoheung Kim clan was one of the smaller Kim clans during the Joseon. The progenitor was Kim Bo (김보, 金寶) and one of the members was Kim Gwoeng-pil (김굉필, 金宏弼), who was one of the 18 Sages of Korea and honored as Munmyo Bae-hyang, (문묘배향, 文廟配享).

Wonju
The Wonju Kim clan might be one of the smallest Kim clans during the Joseon. They had two members that became prime ministers during that period.

Jeonju
According to the South Korean census of 2015, there were 56,989 members of the Jeonju Kim clan in South Korea. Its progenitor, Kim Bongmo, was descended from the last king of Silla, Gyeongsun of Silla. South Korean artist Kim Hee-chul is from the Jeonju clan, as are the North Korean leaders Kim Il-sung, Kim Jong-il, and Kim Jong-un.

Other clans

 Ansan Kim clan, 안산김씨
 Bu-an Kim clan, 부안김씨
 Cheongdo Kim clan, 청도김씨
 Cheongju Kim clan, 청주김씨
 Daegu Kim clan, 대구김씨
 Dogang Kim clan, 도강김씨 (Gangjin Kim clan, 강진김씨)
 Eon-yang Kim clan, 언양김씨
 Gaeseong Kim clan, 개성김씨
 Geumsan Kim clan, 금산김씨
 Gim-nyeong Kim clan, 김녕김씨
 Gongju Kim clan, 공주김씨
 Go-ryeong Kim clan, 고령김씨
 Go-seong Kim clan, 고성김씨
 Gwangju Kim clan, 광주김씨
 Gyeongseong Kim, 경성김씨
 Hanyang Kim clan, 한양김씨 (Korean adoptees)
 Jeonju Kim clan, 전주김씨 
 Jinju Kim clan, 진주김씨
 Joong-hwa Kim clan, 중화씨
 Naju Kim clan, 나주김씨
 Pungcheon Kim clan, 풍천김씨
 Pungsan Kim clan, 풍산김씨
 Samcheok Kim clan, 삼척김씨
 Seoha Kim clan, 서하김씨
 Seonsan Kim clan, 선산김씨
 Suncheon Kim clan, 순천김씨
 Suwon Kim clan, 수원김씨
 Ye-an Kim clan, 예안김씨
 Yeongdong Kim clan, 영동김씨 (Yeongsan Kim clan, 영산김씨)
 Yeong-gwang Kim clan, 영광김씨

See also

Culture of Korea
Korean name
List of Korean family names

Notes

Notable people

References

Surnames of Korean origin
Kim